The 2020 Bandy World Championship was to be an international sports tournament between men's national teams among bandy playing nations. It was to be the fortieth Bandy World Championship. While the Division B tournament was held from 1 to 6 March 2020,
the Division A tournament was postponed a number of times and finally cancelled on 1 March 2022.

The Division A tournament was supposed to be held from 29 March to 5 April 2020 but was postponed due to the COVID-19 pandemic. The Division A tournament was cancelled on 15 September 2020. The FIB later announced that the 2020 Division A tournament in Irkutsk would be finalised in October 2021, and the subsequent World Championship in Syktyvkar would be played in 2022. On 24 August 2021, Sweden announced its withdrawals from the competition, due to the continued threat of COVID-19. Finland and Norway had already made the same decisions earlier. Subsequently, on 30 August 2021, the FIB decided to postpone the championships once again, now to March - April 2022, which would be the 2022 Bandy World Championship.

Host selection
The 2019 tournament was originally supposed to be held in Irkutsk in Russia, but the decision was reconsidered
 due to a failure to meet the demands on an arena accepted for international play and the tournament was held in Vänersborg in Sweden instead.

For 2020, the new Arena Baikal will be ready for play, and therefore, this year's world championship will be held in Irkutsk. Some games will probably be played in surrounding cities too.

The last time the World Championship was held in Irkutsk, was in 2014.

Venues
 Syktyvkar – Ice Palace Arena

Qualified nations 
Based on the nations taking part in the last world championship tournament and the qualification made there, the following nations were foreseen to participate.

Division A

Pool A

Pool B

Division B

Division A

Preliminary round

Group A

Group B

Knockout stage

Bracket

Quarterfinals

Seventh place game

Fifth place game

Semifinals

Third place game

Final

Division B

Preliminary round

Group A

Group B

Knockout stage

Bracket

Quarterfinals

5–8th place semifinals

Semifinals

Ninth place game

Switzerland won 14–1 on aggregate.

Seventh place game

Fifth place game

Third place game

Final

Final ranking

References

External links
Official website

2020-21
World Championship
World Championship
World Championships,2020
Sport in Irkutsk
2020 in Russian sport
2022 in Russian sport
March 2020 sports events in Russia
October 2021 sports events in Russia
Sports events cancelled due to the COVID-19 pandemic
Sports events postponed due to the COVID-19 pandemic
Sports events affected by the 2022 Russian invasion of Ukraine